KCID (1490 AM) (now Salt & Light's local Spanish Catholic)  is a radio station broadcasting a Spanish religious format. Licensed to Caldwell, Idaho, United States, the station serves the Boise area. The station is currently owned by Salt & Light Radio.

Former owners Journal Broadcast Group announced July 22, 2009  that KCID, along with sister station KGEM 1140AM, were to be sold to Salt & Light Radio for $950,000. The sale closed on September 25, 2009, and the station will be converted to Salt & Light's local Spanish Catholic radio format.

References

External links

FCC History Cards for KCID 

CID
Caldwell, Idaho
Radio stations established in 1989